In Biblical criticism,  is a German phrase roughly translating to "setting in life". It stands for the context in which a text, or object, has been created, and its function and purpose at that time. The  is also used to refer to the social, ethnic and cultural setting of a site at a particular era. When interpreting a text, object, or region, the  has to be taken into consideration in order to allow a proper contextual interpretation.

Origins
The term originated with the German Protestant theologian Hermann Gunkel and originally was stated in the Bible. The term  ("setting in the life of the people") was employed for the first time in 1906 and the term  in 1918. The term  was used by classic form critics, as discussed by Chris Tuckett, "...it has been pointed out that the term  was used in a rather peculiar way by the classic form critics. In fact the term is a sociological one, describing a typical situation within any community" so that the meaning of the text is bound up with its function in the community, and social context. Some have noted that it is also used in Biblical language.

References

Biblical criticism
Biblical exegesis
Literary criticism
German words and phrases
Discourse analysis
1900s neologisms